Onarıcı is a Turkish surname. Notable people with the surname include:

 Berkay Onarıcı (born 1987), Turkish footballer
 Necmi Onarıcı (1925–1968), Turkish footballer

Turkish-language surnames